Mohammad Rafiquzzaman (born 11 February 1943) is a Bangladeshi lyricist. He was awarded Bangladesh National Film Award for Best Lyrics twice for the lyrics of "Tumi Emoni Jaal Petechho Shongshare" in Shuvoda (1986) and "Phuler Bashor Bhanglo Jokhon"  in Chandranath (1984). He is credited with 2000 songs, three collections of songs, four collections of poems and three collections of essays on music.

Career
Rafiquzzaman got his breakthrough in 1965 through his lyrics of the song "Mugdho Amar Ei Chokh Jokhon". He wrote a book titled Adhunik Bangla Gaan Rochonar Kolakoushal.

Works
 Dukhkho Amar Bashor Raat-er Palonko
 Bondhu Hotey Cheye Tomar Shotru Boley Gonno Holaam
 Eto Shukh Shoibo Kemoney
 Amar Mon Pakhita Jaye Re Urey
 Amake Ekti Doyel Bolechhey
 Paharer Kanna Dekhe
 Jodi Moroner Porey Keo Proshno Korey
 Tumi Eshechho Bohudin Por
 Shobai Boley Joto Shorbonasher Muul 
 Jibon Namer Railgarita paye na Khujey Station
 Amar Baul Moner Ektara Ta

Awards
 Bachsas Awards
 Bangladesh National Film Award for Best Lyrics

References

External links

1943 births
Living people
Place of birth missing (living people)
Best Lyricist National Film Award (Bangladesh) winners
Bangladeshi lyricists
Best Story National Film Award (Bangladesh) winners